Solariella is a genus of small to minute sea snails, marine gastropod molluscs in the family Solariellidae within the superfamily Trochoidea, the top snails, turban snails and their allies. 

This genus was founded by S. Wood for an English fossil trochid, conical in form, with tubular whorls and a deep umbilicus, its margin crenulated.

Species
According to the World Register of Marine Species (WoRMS), the following species with valid names are included within the genus Solariella

 Solariella amabilis (Jeffreys, 1865)
 Solariella anarensis Dell, 1972
 Solariella antarctica Powell, 1958
 Solariella bathyantarctica Numanami, 1996
 Solariella bermejoi Rolán, Hernández & Deniz, 2005
 † Solariella bimarginata (Deshayes, 1863)
 Solariella brychia (R. B. Watson, 1879)
 Solariella cancilla Dall, 1927
 † Solariella carinata (Laws, 1935)
 Solariella carvalhoi Loper and Cardoso, 1958
 Solariella chani Vilvens, 2009
 Solariella charopa (Watson, 1879)
 † Solariella cheloti Le Renard, 1994 
 Solariella chodon Vilvens, 2009
 Solariella cincta (Philippi, 1836)
 Solariella cingulima (Locard, 1898)
 Solariella cristata Quinn, 1992
 Solariella crossata (Dall, 1927)
 Solariella dedonderorum (Poppe, Tagaro & Dekker, 2006)
 Solariella delicata Dall, 1919
 Solariella depressa (Dall, 1889)
 Solariella diomedea Dall, 1919
 † Solariella discreta (Deshayes, 1863) 
 † Solariella dumasi (Cossmann, 1907) 
 † Solariella duvergieri Cossmann & Peyrot, 1917
 Solariella dowi Barnard, 1963 (taxon inquirendum)
 Solariella elegantula Dall, 1925
 † Solariella filosa Cossmann, 1888 †
 † Solariella fossa (Laws, 1932)
 Solariella galkini Bagirov, 1995
 † Solariella grata (Deshayes, 1863) 
 † Solariella griesbachi Kiel, 2003 
 Solariella inoptanda (Locard, 1898)
 Solariella intermedia (Leche, 1878) - intermediate solarelle
 Solariella iris (Dall, 1881)
 Solariella kempi A.W.B. Powell, 1951
 Solariella lacunella (Dall, 1881) - channeled solarelle
 † Solariella lenis (Marwick, 1928)
 Solariella lupe Rolán, Hernández & Deniz, 2005
 Solariella lusitanica (P. Fischer, 1887)
 † Solariella maculata Wood, 1842
 Solariella margaritifera (Okutani, 1964)
 Solariella marginata Schepman, 1908
 † Solariella marginulata (Philippi, 1844)
 † Solariella marshalli (P. A. Maxwell, 1992)
 Solariella micraulax J. H. McLean, 1964 - fine-groove solarelle
 † Solariella miosuturalis'' (Kautsky, 1925) 
 Solariella multirestis Quinn, 1979
 Solariella nanshaensis Zhengzhi, 2002
 Solariella neglecta Thiele, 1925
 Solariella obscura (Couthouy, 1838) - obscure solarelle
 Solariella patriae Carcelles, 1953
 Solariella periomphalia (E. von Martens, 1901)
 Solariella periscopia Dall, 1927 - look-around solarelle
 Solariella peristicta Marshall, 1999
 Solariella plakhus Vilvens, 2009
 Solariella pompholugota (Watson, 1879)
 Solariella pygmaea Poppe, Tagaro & Dekker, 2006
 Solariella quinni Barros & Pereira, 2008
 Solariella rhina (R. B. Watson, 1886)
 Solariella sanjuanensis Poppe, Tagaro & Dekker, 2006
 Solariella segersi (Poppe, Tagaro & Dekker, 2006)
 † Solariella simplex (Deshayes, 1863) 
 † Solariella spirata (Lamarck, 1804) 
  †Solariella straeleni Glibert, 1952 
 † Solariella susanae P. A. Maxwell, 1988
 Solariella tavernia Dall, 1919
 Solariella tenuicollaris Golikov & Sirenko, 1998
 Solariella triplostephanus Dall, 1910
 † Solariella trivialis Lozouet, 2015
 † Solariella trochiformis (Deshayes, 1832) 
 † Solariella trochulus (Deshayes, 1863)
 Solariella tubula Dall, 1927
 † Solariella turbinoides (Lamarck, 1804) 
 Solariella vancouverensis (E. A. Smith, 1880)
 Solariella varicosa (Mighels & C. B. Adams, 1842) - varicose solarelle
 Solariella zacalles Melvill, 1903

Species brought into synonymy
 Solariella (Microgaza) Dall, 1881 represented as Microgaza Dall, 1881 (alternate representation)
 Solariella actinophora Dall, 1890: synonym of Calliotropis actinophora (Dall, 1890)
 Solariella aeglees Watson, 1879: synonym of Calliotropis aeglees (Watson, 1879)
 Solariella affinis (Friele, 1877): synonym of Solariella amabilis (Jeffreys, 1865)
 Solariella agulhasensis Thiele, 1925: synonym of Ilanga agulhaensis (Thiele, 1925)
 Solariella algoensis Thiele, 1925: synonym of Pseudominolia articulata (Gould, 1861)
 Solariella amabilis auct. non Jeffreys, 1865: synonym of Lamellitrochus incerinatus Quinn, 1991
 Solariella ambigua Dautzenberg & H. Fischer, 1896: synonym of Calliotropis ambigua (Dautzenberg & Fischer, 1896)
 Solariella anoxia Dall, 1927: synonym of Echinogurges anoxius (Dall, 1927)
 Solariella aquamarina Melvill, J.C., 1909: synonym of Ilanga aquamarina (Melvill, 1909)
 Solariella asperrima (Dall, 1881): synonym of Dentistyla asperrima (Dall, 1881)
 Solariella basilica Marshall, 1999: synonym of Spectamen basilicum (Marshall, 1999)
 Solariella beckeri G.B. Sowerby, 1892: synonym of Solariella fuscomaculata G.B. Sowerby, 1892
 Solariella benthicola (Powell, 1937): synonym of Spectamen benthicola  (Powell, 1937)
 Solariella biradiatula Martens, 1902: synonym of Ilanga biradiatula (Martens, 1902)
 Solariella calatha Dall, 1927: synonym of Calliotropis calatha (Dall, 1927)
 Solariella cancapae Vilvens & Swinnen, 2007: synonym of Lamellitrochus cancapae (Vilvens & Swinnen, 2007)
 Solariella callomphala Schepman, 1908: synonym of Bathymophila callomphala (Schepman, 1908)

 Solariella canaliculata Dollfus, 1911: synonym of Lirularia canaliculata (E.A. Smith, 1871)
 Solariella ceratophora Dall, 1896: synonym of Calliotropis ceratophora (Dall, 1896)
 Solariella chuni Thiele, 1925: synonym of Solariella intermissa Thiele, 1925
 Solariella clavatus Watson, 1879: synonym of Echinogurges clavatus (Watson, 1879)
 Solariella constricta Dall, 1927: synonym of Haloceras carinata (Jeffreys, 1883)
 Solariella constricta auct. non Dall, 1927: synonym of Haloceras trichotropoides Warén & Bouchet, 1991
 Solariella corbis Dall, 1889: synonym of Mirachelus corbis (Dall, 1889)
 Solariella dentifera Dall, 1889: synonym of Dentistyla dentifera (Dall, 1889)
 Solariella dereimsi Dollfus, 1911: synonym of Lirularia dereimsi (Dollfus, 1911)
 Solariella dilecta (Sowerby III, 1899): synonym of Pseudominolia articulata (Gould, 1861)
 Solariella durbanensis Kilburn, 1977: synonym of Ethminolia durbanensis (Kilburn, 1977)
 Solariella effossima Locard, 1898: synonym of Calliotropis effossima (Locard, 1898)
 Solariella euteia Vilvens, 2009: synonym of Spectamen euteium (Vilvens, 2009) (original combination)
 Solariella exigua Locard, 1898: synonym of Spectamen exiguum (B. A. Marshall, 1999)
 Solariella fera Bagirov, 1995: synonym of Solariella margaritifera (Okutani, 1964)
 Solariella flavida B. A. Marshall, 1999: synonym of Spectamen flavidum (B. A. Marshall, 1999) (original combination)
 Solariella franciscana Barnard, 1963: synonym of Spectamen franciscanum (Barnard, 1963)
 Solariella gilchristi Barnard, 1963: synonym of Solariella intermissa Thiele, 1925
 Solariella gilvosplendens Melvill, 1891: synonym of Minolia gilvosplendens Melvill, 1891
 Solariella gratiosa Thiele, 1925: synonym of Ilanga gratiosa (Thiele, 1925)
 Solariella hondoensis Dall, 1919: synonym of Calliotropis hondoensis (Dall, 1919)
 Solariella hurleyi Marshall, 1979: synonym of Archiminolia hurleyi (B. A. Marshall, 1979)
 Solariella illustris Sturany, 1904: synonym of Ilanga illustris (Sturany, 1904)
 Solariella incisura Melvill, 1909: synonym of Ilanga incisura (Melvill, 1909)
 Solariella infundibulum (Watson, 1879): synonym of Calliotropis infundibulum(Watson, 1879)
 Soraliella inoptanda (Locard, 1897): synonym of Solariella cincta (Philippi, 1836)
 Solariella iridescens Habe, 1968: synonym of Microgaza iridescens (Habe, 1968)
 Solariella intermissa  Thiele, 1925: synonym of Zetela semisculpta (Martens, 1904)
 Solariella koreanica Dall, 1919: synonym of Margarites koreanicus (Dall, 1919)
 Solariella laevissima (Martens, 1881): synonym of Ilanga laevissima (Martens, 1881)
 Solariella lamellosa auct. non Verrill & Smith, 1880: synonym of Lamellitrochus inceratus Quinn, 1991
 Solariella lamellosus (Dall, 1881) - lamellose solarelle: synonym of Lamellitrochus lamellosus (Verrill & S. Smith, 1880)
 Solariella lewisae (Dall, 1881): synonym of Solariella obscura (Couthouy, 1838)
 Solariella lissocona (Dall, 1881): synonym of Calliotropis lissocona (Dall, 1881)
 Solariella lubrica Dall, 1881: synonym of Suavotrochus lubricus (Dall, 1881)
 Solariella luteola (Powell, 1937): synonym of Spectamen luteolum (Powell, 1937)
 Solariella macleari Barnard, 1963: synonym of Solariella intermissa Thiele, 1925
 Solariella meyeri Kilburn, 1973: synonym of Ilanga biradiatula (Martens, 1902)
 Solariella micans Dautzenberg & H. Fischer, 1896: synonym of Bathymophila micans (Dautzenberg & H. Fischer, 1896)
 Solariella mogadorensis Locard, 1898: synonym of Calliotropis mogadorensis (Locard, 1898)
 Solariella multilirata Odhner, N.H.J., 1912: synonym of Solariella obscura (Couthouy, 1838)
 Solariella multistriata Barnard, 1963: synonym of Ilanga agulhaensis (Thiele, 1925)
 Solariella multistriata Thiele, 1925: synonym of Spectamen multistriatum (Thiele, 1925)
 Solariella mutabilis Schepman, 1908: synonym of Spectamen mutabilis (Schepman, 1908)
 Solariella nektonica Okutani, 1961: synonym of Ethminolia nektonica (Okutani, 1961)
 Solariella nitens Thiele, 1925: synonym of Ilanga laevissima (Martens, 1881)
 Solariella nuda Dall, 1896: synonym of Chonospeira nuda (Dall, 1896)
 Solariella nyssonus Dall, 1919: synonym of Minolia nyssonus (Dall, 1919)
 Solariella olivaceostrigata Schepman, 1908: synonym of Archiminolia olivaceostrigata (Schepman, 1908)
 Solariella opalina Shikama & Hayashi, 1977: synonym of Microgaza opalina (Shikama & Hayashi, 1977)
 † Solariella ordo (Laws, 1941): synonym of † Spectamen ordo (Laws, 1941) (superseded combination)
 Solariella ornatissima (Schepman, 1908): synonym of Ethminolia ornatissima (Schepman, 1908)
 Solariella oxybasis Dall, 1890: synonym of Bathybembix bairdii (Dall, 1889)
 Solariella oxycona E.A. Smith, 1899: synonym of Calliotropis oxycona (E. A. Smith, 1899)
 Solariella peramabilis Carpenter, 1864: synonym of Minolia peramabilis Carpenter, 1864
 Solariella plicatula (Murdoch & Suter, 1906): synonym of Spectamen plicatulum (Murdoch & Suter, 1906)
 Solariella pourtalesi Clench & Aguayo, 1939: synonym of Lamellitrochus pourtalesi (Clench & Aguayo, 1939)
 Solariella pseudobscura Yokoyama, 1927: synonym of Minolia pseudobscura (Yokoyama, 1927)
 Solariella pulchella Turton, 1932: synonym of Solariella fuscomaculata G.B. Sowerby, 1892
 Solariella quadricincta Quinn, 1992: synonym of Solariella carvalhoi Lopes & Cardoso, 1958
 Solariella regalis (Verrill & S. Smith, 1880): synonym of Calliotropis regalis (Verrill & Smith, 1880)
 Solariella rhina (Watson, 1886): synonym of Calliotropis rhina (Watson, 1886)
 Solariella rhyssa Dall, 1919: synonym of Solariella peramabilis Carpenter, 1864
 Solariella rudecta (Locard, 1898): synonym of Calliotropis rudecta (Locard, 1898)
 Solariella rufanensis Turton, 1932: synonym of Solariella fuscomaculata G.B. Sowerby, 1892
 Solariella sculpta G.B. Sowerby, 1897: synonym of Ethminolia sculpta (G.B. Sowerby, 1897)
 Solariella semisculpta (Martens, 1904): synonym of Spectamen semisculptum (Martens, 1904)
 Solariella sericifila (Dall, 1889): synonym of Dentistyla sericifilum (Dall, 1889)
 Solariella semireticulata (Suter, 1908): synonym of Spectamen semireticulatum (Suter, 1908)
 Solariella splendens Sowerby, 1897: synonym of Pseudominolia splendens (G.B. Sowerby, 1897)
 Solariella staminea Quinn, 1992: synonym of Solariella carvalhoi Lopes & Cardoso, 1958
 Solariella stearnsi (Pilsbry, 1895): synonym of Ethminolia stearnsii (Pilsbry, 1895): synonym of Sericominolia stearnsii (Pilsbry, 1895)
 Solariella talismani Locard, 1898: synonym of Calliotropis talismani (Locard, 1898)
 Solariella textilis (Murdoch & Suter, 1906): synonym of Zetela textilis (Murdoch & Suter, 1906)
 Solariella tiara (Watson, 1879): synonym of Calliotropis tiara (Watson, 1879)
 Solariella tiara auct. non Watson, 1879: synonym of Lamellitrochus lamellosus (Verrill & Smith, 1880)
 Solariella tragema Melvill & Standen, 1896: synonym of Vanitrochus tragema (Melvill & Standen, 1896)
 Solariella tryphenensis (Powell, 1930): synonym of Spectamen tryphenense (Powell, 1930)
 Solariella tuberculata Bagirov, 1995: synonym of Solariella delicata Dall, 1919
 Solariella turbynei Barnard, 1963: synonym of Spectamen turbynei (Barnard, 1963)
 Solariella tubulata Dall, 1927: synonym of Echinogurges tubulatus (Dall, 1927)
 Solariella undata Sowerby, 1870: synonym of Ilanga undata (G.B. Sowerby, 1870)
 Solariella vaillanti (P. Fischer, 1882): synonym of Calliotropis vaillanti (P. Fischer, 1882)
 Solariella valdiviae Thiele, 1925: synonym of Ilanga undata undata (G.B. Sowerby, 1870)
 Solariella valida Dautzenberg & H. Fischer, 1896: synonym of Calliotropis valida (Dautzenberg & Fischer, 1906)
 Solariella variabilis (Dell, 1956): synonym of Zetela variabilis Dell, 1956
 † Solariella venusta (P. A. Maxwell, 1969): synonym of † Spectamen venustum (P. A. Maxwell, 1969) 
 Solariella vera (Powell, 1937): synonym of Spectamen verum (Powell, 1937)
 Solariella zacalles Melvill & Standen, 1903: synonym of Archiminolia zacalles (Melvill & Standen, 1903)
 Solariella zacalloides Schepman, 1908: synonym of Microgaza fulgens Dall, 1907
 Incertae sedis Solariella mutabilis var laevior Schepman, 1908 Solariella mutabilis var. plicifera Schepman, 1908

Species inquirenda
 Solariella fuscomaculata G.B. Sowerby, 1892
 Solariella humillima Thiele, 1925
 Solariella turritellina Ancey, 1881

The Indo-Pacific Molluscan Database also includes the following species with names in current use:

 Solariella baxteri McLean, 1995
 Solariella marginata Schepman, 1908
 Solariella oxycona Smith, 1899

 Subgenus Solariella Wood, 1842
 Solariella bellula Melvill & Standen
 Solariella deliciosa Preston, 1916
 Solariella dulcissima Preston, 1908

Other species within the genus Solariella include:Powell A. W. B., New Zealand Mollusca, William Collins Publishers Ltd, Auckland, New Zealand 1979 
 Solariella laevis Friele, 1886 - smooth solarelle
 Solariella maculata S. V. Wood, 1842
 Solariella margaritus Solariella scabriuscula (Dall, 1881)

References

 Gofas, S.; Le Renard, J.; Bouchet, P. (2001). Mollusca, in: Costello, M.J. et al. (Ed.) (2001). European register of marine species: a check-list of the marine species in Europe and a bibliography of guides to their identification''. Collection Patrimoines Naturels, 50: pp. 180–213

External links
 Friele H. (1877) Tungebevæbningen hos de Norske Rhipidoglossa. Archiv for mathematik og naturvidenskab, 2: 199-317, pl. 1-5

 
Solariellidae